Kim Hyun-jun (Hangul: 김현준; June 3, 1960 – October 2, 1999) was a South Korean basketball player.

He played as a shooting guard. He was 182 cm (5 ft 11.75 in) tall. He competed at the 1988 Seoul Olympic Games, where the South Korean team finished in ninth position.

His former teams include Samsung Electronics, and he appointed assistant coach of Samsung Electronics after he retired a player.

He died of a car accident in Seongnam on October 2, 1999.

References

1960 births
1999 deaths
Basketball players at the 1988 Summer Olympics
Olympic basketball players of South Korea
South Korean men's basketball players
1978 FIBA World Championship players
1990 FIBA World Championship players
Asian Games medalists in basketball
Basketball players at the 1986 Asian Games
Basketball players at the 1990 Asian Games
Seoul Samsung Thunders players
South Korean basketball coaches
Seoul Samsung Thunders coaches
Yonsei University alumni
Road incident deaths in South Korea
Shooting guards
Korean Basketball League players with retired numbers
Asian Games silver medalists for South Korea
Asian Games bronze medalists for South Korea
Medalists at the 1986 Asian Games
Medalists at the 1990 Asian Games
South Korean Buddhists
1986 FIBA World Championship players
People from Seongnam
Sportspeople from Gyeonggi Province